There have been two baronetcies created for persons with the surname Knollys, one in the Baronetage of England and one in the Baronetage of Great Britain. Both creations became extinct on the death of the first holder.

The Knollys Baronetcy, of Grove Place in the County of Southampton, was created in the Baronetage of England on 6 May 1642 for Henry Knollys. The title became extinct on his death in 1648.

The Knollys Baronetcy, of Thame in the County of Oxford, was created in the Baronetage of Great Britain on 1 April 1754 for Francis Knollys, subsequently Member of Parliament for Reading. The title became extinct on his death in 1772.

Knollys baronets, of Grove Place (1642)
Sir Henry Knollys, 1st Baronet (–1648)

Knollys baronets, of Thame (1754)

Sir Francis Knollys, 1st Baronet (–1772)

See also
 Knollys (disambiguation)
 Knollys (surname)
 Knowles baronets

References

Extinct baronetcies in the Baronetage of England
Extinct baronetcies in the Baronetage of Great Britain